Saloum is a 2021 Senegalese crime horror-thriller film directed by Congolese director Jean Luc Herbulot and produced by Pamela Diop. The film stars Yann Gael, Mentor Ba and Roger Sallah in the lead roles with Evelyne Ily Juhen, Bruno Henry, and Marielle Salmier in supporting roles. The film revolves around Bangui's Hyenas, an elite trio of mercenaries that extract a drug dealer and his bricks of gold amidst Guinea-Bissau's coup d'état of 2003.

The film had its international premiere in the Midnight Madness section at the 2021 Toronto International Film Festival on 30 September 2021. The film received critical acclaim and was screened worldwide and began streaming internationally on Shudder in September 2022.

The film was met with positive reviews. Herbulot won the Award for the best director in the Next Wave section at the Fantastic Fest, and the film won the Audience Award for most popular film in the Altered States program at the 2021 Vancouver International Film Festival.

Plot 
Mercenary group Bangui's Hyenas are tasked with extracting a Mexican drug lord from Guinea-Bissau amid the 2003 coup d'état and taking him to Dakar. On route, a leak with the group's airplane forces them to land in remote Sine-Saloum, where they must reckon with suspicious residents, difficult environmental conditions and supernatural events before they are able to depart.

Cast
Yann Gael as Chaka
Roger Sallah as Rafa
Mentor Ba as Minuit
Evelyne Ily Juhen as Awa
Bruno Henry as Omar
Marielle Salmier as Sephora
Babacar Oualy as Salamane
Ndiaga Mbow as Souleymane
Cannabasse as Youce
Renaud Farah as Felix
Alvina Karamoko with voice

Reception

Jeanette Catsoulis reviewed the film positively in The New York Times, saying "The plot is ludicrously jam-packed, but the pace is fleet and the dialogue has wit and a carefree bounce". Richard Kuipers of Variety wrote that "[Saloum] freely mixes and marries the cinematic languages of spaghetti Westerns, samurai dramas and classic monster movies to tell an exciting and distinctly African story". Valerie Complex of Deadline Hollywood praised the film for its "supernatural horror elements", which, according to him also contain "comedy and suspense". In Vulture, Roxana Hadadi praised the film's cinematography, production and sound design and folklore elements, and said the film's "only real disappointment is its visual effects, which once we see them aren’t quite as frightening as what Saloum accomplished through suggestion".

According to Meagan Navarro of Bloody Disgusting, the film's "Spirituality, morality, mythology, and mysticism get thrown into a gritty crime thriller blender, culminating in a refreshingly unique type of genre-bender".

References

External links

Saloum at Rotten Tomatoes

French horror thriller films
2021 horror films
Senegalese drama films
2020s Western (genre) horror films
2020s French films
African horror films
Films set in Guinea-Bissau
Films about coups d'état
Shudder (streaming service) original programming
Wolof-language films
2020s French-language films
2020s crime films
Films based on African myths and legends
Sign-language films
Films set in Senegal
2020s heist films
Films set in 2003
Films set on beaches